Mihai Ionescu (19 November 1936 – 19 January 2011) was a Romanian footballer who played at both international and professional levels as a goalkeeper.

Club career
Mihai Ionescu was born on 19 November 1936 Ploiești, Romania, playing all of his career at teams from his native town, first at Prahova from 1958 until 1960. Afterwards he went to play at Petrolul where he spent 13 seasons, making his Divizia A debut under coach Ilie Oană on 4 September 1960 in a 3–1 victory against Dinamo Bacău. Ionescu played for The Yellow Wolves in the 6–1 victory against Siderurgistul Galați from the 1963 Cupa României Final when he was introduced by Oană in the 85th minute in order to replace Vasile Sfetcu and won a Divizia A title with the team in the 1965–66 season, being used by coach Constantin Cernăianu in 26 games. He played two games for Petrolul in the first round of the 1966–67 European Cup against Liverpool which include a 3–1 victory, however they did not manage to qualify to the next round. Ionescu also made some individual performances as being named the best goalkeeper from Romania by the Sportul newspaper in 1965 and 1966. He made his last Divizia A appearance, playing for Petrolul on 20 June 1973 in a 2–1 away loss against ASA Târgu Mureș, having a total of 256 matches played in the competition, also having a total of 9 games played in European competitions (including 6 games in the Inter-Cities Fairs Cup). After he ended his career, Ionescu worked as vice-president at Petrolul from 1973 until 1975, being also Mihai Mocanu's assistant coach at the team from April until July 1975, head coach at Metalul Filipeștii de Pădure and president for 10 years at AJF Prahova. In 2002, Ionescu was awarded the Honorary Citizen of the Ploiești Municipality title. Mihai Ionescu died on 19 January 2011 at the age of 74, after suffering an operation on the head a few days earlier at the Emergency Clinical Hospital from Bucharest.

International career
Mihai Ionescu played 13 games at international level for Romania, making his debut on 19 September 1965 under coach Ilie Oană in a 3–1 away loss against Czechoslovakia at the 1966 World Cup qualifiers. His second game was a 2–0 home victory against Portugal, which also took place at the 1966 World Cup qualifiers and he played four games at the Euro 1968 qualifiers, including his last appearance which took place on 24 May 1967 in a 7–1 away loss against Switzerland.

Honours
Petrolul Ploiești
Divizia A: 1965–66
Cupa României: 1962–63

References

1936 births
2011 deaths
Romanian footballers
Romania international footballers
Liga I players
Liga II players
FC Petrolul Ploiești players
Association football goalkeepers